Cherevychne is a municipality in Ukraine in Odesa Raion, Odesa Oblast. It belongs to Usatove rural hromada, one of the hromadas of Ukraine. The population is 135.

Until 18 July 2020, Cherevychne belonged to Biliaivka Raion. The raion was abolished in July 2020 as part of the administrative reform of Ukraine, which reduced the number of raions of Odesa Oblast to seven. The area of Biliaivka Raion was merged into Odesa Raion.

See also
 Chobotarivka

References

Villages in Odesa Raion
Usatove Hromada